= The Returnees =

2020 novel by Elizabeth Okoh

- First edition
- Author: Elizabeth Okoh
- Language: English
- Set in: Nigeria
- Publisher: Hodder & Stoughton
- Publication date: August 6, 2020
- Pages: 304
- ISBN: 9781529380552
- OCLC: 1196322088

The Returnees is a novel written by Elizabeth Okoh. It was first publish in 2020 by Hodder & Stoughton an imprint of Hachette UK.
